Danny Danon (Hebrew: דני דנון, born 8 May 1971) served as Israel’s 17th Permanent Representative to the United Nations, and currently serves as Chairman of the World Likud. Danon previously served as a member of the Knesset from the Likud Party, as Minister of Science, Technology and Space, and as Deputy Minister of Defense. During his term in the 18th Knesset, Danon served as Deputy Speaker, Chair of the Special Committee on the Rights of the Child, and Chair of the Committee for Immigration, Absorption and Diaspora Affairs. In June 2016, Danon was elected as chair of the UN’s Legal Committee, the first Israeli to ever hold the position.

Early life 
Danon was born in Ramat Gan to Yosef and Yoheved Danon. His father was born in Egypt, and moved to Israel in 1950. He was severely wounded in the Jordan Valley during the War of Attrition, and died when Danny was 13. Danon attended Blich High School and was a member of the Betar youth movement. In 1989, he was drafted into the army and completed his officer's course with distinction. He served as an officer in the Education Corps and was released with the rank of captain. In his final military posting, he served as an officer in the Marava unit, a military program for Jews from around the world to strengthen ties to Israel. He earned a Bachelor's degree in international affairs from the Florida International University, and a Master's degree in public policy from the Hebrew University of Jerusalem. After his national service in the IDF between 1989 and 1993, Danon was sent to Miami by the Jewish Agency.

Political career 
In 1996, he was appointed assistant to Likud MK Uzi Landau. Later on he became the Chairman of the World Betar organization for a few years. Prior to the 2006 elections, Danon won the 23rd spot on Likud's list in the party primaries. However, the party won only 12 seats in the general election, and Danon did not enter the Knesset. In June 2006, after beating MK Yuval Steinitz, Danon was elected Chairman of the World Likud organization. Danon was active against Prime Minister Ariel Sharon's disengagement plan during the referendum conducted by the latter in the Likud party's central committee.

In July 2007, Danon, described as one of Benjamin Netanyahu's biggest critics from within the Likud, declared his candidacy for the party's leadership. He eventually finished third in a primary election held that August. In 2008, Danon filed a petition to the Israeli High Court of Justice to rescind the citizenship of former MK Azmi Bishara, who fled Israel after he was suspected of aiding Hezbollah, an enemy organization of Israel, during the 2006 Lebanon War. The petition was rejected.

Prior to the 2009 elections he won twenty-fourth place on the Likud list, and entered the Knesset as the party won 27 seats. He became a Deputy Speaker of the Knesset. In an August 2011 interview with Teymoor Nabili on Al Jazeera English, Mr. Danon said "There is place only for one state on the land of Israel.... I do not believe in a two-state solution."

After being re-elected in 2013, Danon was appointed as Deputy Minister of Defense in Netanyahu's government. However, on 15 July 2014 Danon was fired from the position by Netanyahu after publicly criticizing Netanyahu's handling of Operation Protective Edge.

Danon submitted his candidacy for the 2014 Likud leadership election on 8 December 2014. The only candidate to run against Netanyahu, he received 19% of the votes. After retaining his Knesset seat in the 2015 elections, Danon was appointed Minister of Science, Technology and Space in Netanyahu's new government.

On 14 August 2015, Danon was appointed by Netanyahu to be Israel's envoy to the UN, replacing Ron Prosor. He stepped down as a Knesset member and minister later in the month.

In June 2016, Danon was elected as chairman of the U.N. Legal Committee, making him the first Israeli chosen to head a permanent committee of the U.N.

Public service

Member of the Likud Party 
Danon's time as an emissary for the Jewish Agency had a big impact on his life; it was the first stepping stone in his choice to enter public service.

Upon his return to Israel, Danon served as an adviser to the Chair of the Knesset Foreign affairs and Defense Committee, MK Uzi Landau.

When he was 28 years old, Danon was elected Chair of the World Betar Movement. His responsibilities included managing the administrative, financial, and educational aspects of the organization in Israel and abroad, and encouraging aliyah.

From 2004 to 2009, Danon served as the chairman of the Likud faction in the World Zionist Organization. His responsibilities included encouraging aliyah to Israel and combating Antisemitism. Danon also served on the board of directors of the Jewish Agency, establishing policy, goals and monitoring the work of the Agency.

During the internal primary elections for the Likud Party slate in 2006, Danon was elected to the twenty-third place. In the general elections for the 17th Knesset the Likud only won twelve seats, and Danon did not enter the Knesset. Later that year, Danon ran against MK Yuval Steinitz for the position of Chairman of the World Likud. In this new role, Danon assumed responsibility for the Likud's Israel-advocacy activities, the movement's international relations, and focused on building relationships with pro-Israel communities around the world.

Member of the 18th Knesset 
On December 8, 2008, Danon was elected to the twenty-fourth place on the Likud slate for the upcoming election. In the general elections the Likud party won twenty-seven seats, and Danon was sworn in as a Member of the Knesset.

During this term, MK Danon served as Deputy Speaker of the Knesset, Chair of the Committee on the Rights of the Child, and Chair of the Committee for Immigration, Absorption and Diaspora Affairs. These positions presented Danon with the opportunities to promote legislation in a variety of fields.

In addition to the committees that he chaired, Danon was also a member of the Foreign Affairs and Defense Committee, the Finance Committee, the Education, Culture and Sports Committee, the Constitution, Law and Justice Committee and the Committee on the Status of Women and Gender Equality.

Legislation that Danon promoted included laws granting widows (including those who remarried) of fallen Israeli security personnel and terror attack victims the rights to receive grants from the government. He also promoted a law in which ensured that pardoned convicts who committed a crime during their parole period would automatically be re-imprisoned. In addition, Danon passed a law that limited the promotion and advertisement of alcoholic beverages, and a law that set minimum weight requirements for the modeling industry and required advertisers to disclose whether Photoshop was used in their ads.

Member of the 19th Knesset- Deputy Minister of Defense 
In the Likud internal primaries for the 19th Knesset, Danon won the fifth place, and on March 17, 2013, he was appointed Deputy Minister of Defense.

During his term, Danon focused on increasing enlistment to the IDF from the Christian, and the Ultra-orthodox and Ethiopian Jewish communities, bettering the service conditions of reservists, establishing criteria for financial benefits for the security forces, and decreasing the number of military drop-outs.

In June 2013, Danon was elected Chair of the Likud Party Central Committee, with 85% of the votes.

On July 15, 2014, Danon was dismissed from his position by Prime Minister Netanyahu after publicly criticizing his conduct and his willingness to accept a truce with Hamas during Operation Protective Edge.

Later that year, in December 2014, Danon placed 9th in the Likud's internal primary elections. After the Likud victory in the general elections for the 20th Knesset, Prime Minister Netanyahu appointed Danon to his cabinet to the position of Minister of Science, Technology and Space.

Member of the 20th Knesset- Minister of Science, Technology and Space 
One of the first decisions Danon made after his appointment as Minister of Science, Technology and Space, was to designate the upcoming year as the year of Pioneering Women in Science and Technology. Danon also led efforts to increase awareness for science, technology and space among the residents of developing cities in Israel, by increasing the number of science-focused summer camps. Danon led negotiations with the Ministry of Finance and succeeded in increasing his Ministry's budget by 20%.

During his time in office, Danon dealt with strengthening ties and cooperation between countries and companies around the world. In June 2015, he signed a cooperation agreement with Lockheed Martin on promoting science, technology and space among children. He also visited the Sesame Particle Accelerator in Jordan, which Israel is participating in, to broaden the cooperation between the two states.

Danon served in this position until August 27, 2015, when Prime Minister Netanyahu appointed him as Ambassador and Permanent Representative to the UN.

Legislative accomplishments 
During his tenure in the Knesset, Danon initiated the enactment of the following laws:

 "Weight Limitation Law" (with MK Rachel Adato): To protect models working in the modeling industry, the law states that underweight models (those with a BMI under 18.5) are not allowed to appear in advertisements within Israel. In addition, if graphic editing software is used to control the size of the model, the advertiser will be required to add a caption that takes up at least 7% of the advertisement space to reference this graphical adjustment.
 "Limitations of Marketing Alcoholic Beverages": This law prohibits any advertisement of alcoholic beverages on materials such as billboards and printed items that are intended to be viewed by minors (below the age of 18). In addition, alcoholic beverages should not be offered as prizes in television or radio programs for minors and minors are forbidden to be involved in any form of advertising for intoxicants.
 Amendment to the "Youth Working Law" (with MK Aryeh Eldad), which prohibits the employment of children in blatant advertising.
 Amendment to the "National Health Insurance Law" (with MK Zeev Beilski), which expanded the level of government funding for medical treatment eligibility to children on the autistic spectrum.
 Amendment to the "Weapon’s Law", which lowers the age needed to enter and use a shooting range.

Permanent Representative to the UN 
Danny Danon became Israel's Ambassador and Permanent Representative to the UN in October 2015. At that time a wave of terrorist attack struck Israel, and the situation in Israel made its way to UN discussions. Danon's first speech took place at the Security Council's meeting on the Situation in the Middle East. The Palestinian representative to the UN, Riyad Mansour, interrupted Danon's speech, violating protocol. In a Security Council meeting on the same issue in April 2015, Danon accused the Palestinian representative for failing to condemn terror.

Ambassador Danon has visited Israel with the Secretary General, Ban Ki-moon, where they visited Israelis wounded in the recent wave of terror attacks, and met with the wife of late Richard Lakin, who was brutally stabbed in a terror attack in the capital's Armon Hanatziv neighborhood. Danon visited Israel again with US Ambassador to the UN, Samantha Power, where they toured Israel by helicopter and were briefed on the security challenges Israel faces.

During Danon's term as Permanent Representative, the Israeli Mission marked several notable achievements including: Recognition of Yom Kippur as an Official UN holiday, Acceptance to the Committee on the Peaceful Uses of Outer Space (COPUOS), ZAKA and Access Israel, both Israeli NGOs, received consultative status at the UN, an Israeli UN resolution on Agricultural Technologies for Sustainable Development was adopted by the UN General Assembly, US Secretary of State John Kerry attended an event marking 40 years since Chaim Herzog’s historic UN speech, Israel held the first ever international summit at the UN against BDS, and Ambassador Danon became the first ever Israeli representative to chair a main UN committee. The Israeli Mission also held an event in remembrance of the Jews that were persecuted in Arab countries.

His time as envoy to the UN is also characterized by a strong push against the UN’s historically negative treatment of Israel. After 8 months elapsed in which the UN refused to condemn the wave of terror in Israel, including a statement by UN Secretary General Ban Ki-moon that it is “Human Nature to react to occupation,” On June 9, both the Secretary General and the Security Council condemned terror in Israel for the first time following the Attack in the Sarona Market in Tel Aviv. In addition, the Israeli Mission partnered with "Stand With Us" to display an exhibit about Israel, which was partially censored for its panels about Jerusalem and Zionism, was later displayed fully following pressure and diplomatic efforts by Ambassador Danon.

In 2016, Danon led a delegation of 14 ambassadors from the UN to Israel. Days later, the Security Council adopted resolution 2334, which noted that Israeli settlements in the West Bank, including in Jerusalem, are a violation of international law and an obstacle to peace. Despite Israel anticipating the Obama administration to use its veto, the resolution passed.

On May 31, 2017, Danon was elected as Vice President of the General Assembly as the representative of the Western states.

Danon strongly condemned the UN’s repeated denunciations of Israel at the UN. A noteworthy instance is in his speech in response to UN Resolution 2334 which denounced Israeli construction in Jerusalem. Danon likewise delivered a speech to the UN General Assembly in December 2017 in response to criticism of a decision by the US to move its embassy to Jerusalem.

Return to politics 
On 29 June 2022, ahead of an upcoming legislative election, Danon announced his intention to run for a spot on the Likud's electoral list, and won the 15th spot in a party primary held that August.

Views on conflict with Palestinians
In 2013, Danon asserted that the Likud party has no place for anyone supporting a peace agreement with the Palestinians. He is opposed to a two-state solution. He argues for extending Israeli sovereignty over the majority of the West Bank. Two year prior, in May 2011, Danon advocated that Israel annex all West Bank settlements and "uninhabited areas". He concluded that Israel would bear no responsibility to Palestinians in the West Bank, who would live in their own "unannexed" towns and that this solution would avert the "threat to the Jewish and democratic status of Israel by a growing Palestinian population".

Danon has advocated for punitive attacks against Palestinian civilians and infrastructure, including a suggestion that Israel “delete” one neighborhood in Gaza in response for every rocket launched by Hamas.

In July 2014, Danon advocated cutting off all electricity and fuel supplies to Gaza to induce Hamas to request a cease-fire. Subsequently, on August 1, 2014, after the kidnapping of an Israeli soldier, Danon was quoted as saying "If we don't get the soldier back within a few hours we should start levelling Gaza."

Political views 
MK Danon called for restricting the age of viewing programs with "unworthy" content such as "Big Brother." He also submitted a bill that proposed the establishment of a government authority which would filter online sites that contain pedophilia content and endanger state security, ultimately dealing with information security and privacy on the Web. 

Danon served as chairman of the lobby in the Knesset to solve the problem of asylum seekers from Africa to Israel. On May 23, 2012, he participated in a demonstration in south Tel Aviv against ‘infiltrators’ from Africa, He declared during the rally "The State of Israel is at war! An enemy state of infiltrators has been established within the State of Israel, and its capital - South Tel Aviv. We have to put an end to this, expel all the infiltrators before it is too late.”

In November 2017, an article by Amit Segal published in the Central Edition on Channel Two alleged that Danon had employed about 100 Likud activists in the Zionist organization and in return they would support him. The Israel Police subsequently opened an investigation and in September 2018 announced that the case had been closed because of a lack of evidence.

Writing 
Danon published his first book in September 2012 titled "Israel: the Will to Prevail.” The book analyzes the Israel-US relationship, and presents alternative approaches to the conventional wisdom on negotiating peace between Israelis and Palestinians. It also criticizes President Obama's approach to Israel.

References

External links 
 
 

1971 births
Living people
Deputy ministers of Israel
Ministers of Science of Israel
Deputy Speakers of the Knesset
Florida International University alumni
Hebrew University of Jerusalem Faculty of Social Sciences alumni
Israeli expatriates in the United States
Israeli Jews
Israeli people of Egyptian-Jewish descent
Israeli people of Moroccan-Jewish descent
Jewish Israeli politicians
Likud politicians
Members of the 18th Knesset (2009–2013)
Members of the 19th Knesset (2013–2015)
Members of the 20th Knesset (2015–2019)
Members of the 25th Knesset (2022–)
People from Ramat Gan